Propanidid is an ultra short-acting phenylacetate general anesthetic.  It was originally introduced by Bayer in 1963 but anaphylactic reactions caused it to be withdrawn shortly afterwards.

Even though Cremophor EL has been shown to cause anaphylactic reactions in humans in several cases (both when given intravenously and orally), it is still debated whether propanidid itself may have contributed to the reactions.

It has been argued that the toxic effects or reactions to propanidid (and Althesin) were due to the drugs themselves. Several cases of negative reactions have been recorded for different drugs using Cremophor EL as solubilizer, suggesting that the negative reactions were mainly caused by Cremophor and not by the drug substances themselves.

References

External links
 
 
 
 
 

General anesthetics
Acetate esters
Phenol ethers
Carboxamides
GABAA receptor positive allosteric modulators
Methoxy compounds
Propyl esters
Diethylamino compounds